Cycling at the 2015 Island Games was held from 28 June to 2 July at 5 different Venues in Jersey

 Island Games Course, Saint Helier
 Jubilee Hill
 Tour De Bretagne Course, Saint Helier
 Peoples Park 
 Saint Helier Town Centre

Medal table

Results

Men

Women

References 

2015 Island Games
Cycle racing in the United Kingdom